Kennedia microphylla is a species of flowering plant in the family Fabaceae and is endemic to the south-west of Western Australia. It is a prostrate, mat-forming creeper with relatively small, trifoliate leaves and red flowers.

Description

Taxonomy
Kennedia microphylla was first formally described in 1844 by Carl Meissner in Lehmann's Plantae Preissianae. The specific epithet (microphylla) means "small-leaved".

Distribution and habitat
This kennedia grows in sandy soil in swampy places and in coastal areas in the Avon Wheatbelt, Esperance Plains, Jarrah Forest and Swan Coastal Plain biogeographic regions in south-western Western Australia.

Conservation status
Kennedia microphylla is listed as "not threatened" under the Western Australian Biodiversity Conservation Act 2016.

References

Fabales of Australia
Plants described in 1844
Rosids of Western Australia
microphylla
Taxa named by Carl Meissner